Anni Holm Kirkegaard Matthiesen (born 8 February 1964 in Faaborg) is a Danish politician, who is a member of the Folketing for the Venstre political party. She was elected into parliament at the 2011 Danish general election.

Political career
Matthiesen was first elected into parliament at the 2011 election, where she received 7,017	personal votes. She was reelected in 2015 election with 8,197 votes and in 2019 with 11,308 votes.

References

External links 
 Biography on the website of the Danish Parliament (Folketinget)

1964 births
Living people
People from Faaborg-Midtfyn Municipality
Venstre (Denmark) politicians
21st-century Danish women politicians
Women members of the Folketing
Members of the Folketing 2011–2015
Members of the Folketing 2015–2019
Members of the Folketing 2019–2022
Members of the Folketing 2022–2026